Yuri Dmitriyevich Maslyukov (Russian: Юрий Дмитриевич Маслюков; 30 September 1937 – 1 April 2010) was a Russian politician who was in charge of the Gosplan for three years preceding the demise of the Soviet Union and first deputy prime minister in 1998–1999.

Early life
Yuri Maslyukov was born on 30 September 1937 in the Leninabad in Tajik SSR. He graduated from the Leningrad Mechanical Institute.

Political career
Maslyukov served several positions within both the Soviet Union and the Russian Federation. Within the CPSU, he was candidate member of the Central Committee's Politburo in 1988-1989 and full member from September 20, 1989 to July 14, 1990. Prior to the collapse of the Soviet Union, he held several high-ranking positions with the CPSU, including the post of First Deputy Defense Industry Minister of the Soviet Union. After the dissolution of the Soviet Union he joined the Communist Party of the Russian Federation (CPRF).

Maslyukov was the only Communist member of the Russian Cabinet under Boris Yeltsin, serving as First Deputy Prime Minister of the Russian Federation in the wake of the 1998 Russian financial crisis. He ultimately served as a member of the Committee on Budget Issues and Taxes of the State Duma, until his death on 1 April 2010.

Decorations and awards
Order of Lenin
Order of the October Revolution
Order of the Red Banner of Labour
Order of the Badge of Honour
Diploma of the Government of the Russian Federation
(1997) - for services to the state and many years of hard work
(1999) - for services to the state and many years of hard work
(2002) - for long-term productive state activities
Gratitude of the Government of the Russian Federation (2007) - for long-term and fruitful state activities

References

1937 births
2010 deaths
People from Khujand
Burials in Troyekurovskoye Cemetery
Communist Party of the Soviet Union members
Communist Party of the Russian Federation members
Russian communists
Soviet engineers
20th-century Russian engineers
Politburo of the Central Committee of the Communist Party of the Soviet Union members
People's commissars and ministers of the Soviet Union
Recipients of the Order of Lenin
Tajikistani people of Russian descent
Deputy heads of government of the Russian Federation
Second convocation members of the State Duma (Russian Federation)
Third convocation members of the State Duma (Russian Federation)
Fourth convocation members of the State Duma (Russian Federation)
Fifth convocation members of the State Duma (Russian Federation)